Corner Nunatak is a nunatak at the extreme northeast corner of the Miller Range, between Nimrod Glacier and Marsh Glacier. It was named by the northern party of the New Zealand Geological Survey Antarctic Expedition (1961–62).

References
 

Nunataks of Oates Land